"For Richer For Poorer" is the series finale episode of the BBC sitcom, The Green Green Grass. It was screened on 5 March 2009, as the last episode of the fourth series and the final appearances of the main cast in this series.

Synopsis
Boycie and Marlene have been married for nearly forty years so Marlene is planning a huge party to celebrate their Ruby wedding anniversary. A marquee and caterers have been booked, the flowers are being organised and a band has been booked to play their song – "What's New Pussycat?" Meanwhile, the guest list has grown to an enormous length and Marlene has contacted their old Peckham solicitor. However, he brings bad news – the registrar who married them was unlicensed, so they have never been married.

Episode cast

Production, broadcast and reception

Broadcast
Broadcast on 5 March 2009 on BBC1 at 8:30pm.

Writer and cast
This episode was written by Gary Lawson and John Phelps.

See also
 Lovers and Friends, 1977-1978 American soap opera that was renamed For Richer, for Poorer in its second series

References

British TV Comedy Guide for The Green Green Grass
BARB viewing figures

2009 British television episodes
The Green Green Grass episodes
British television series finales